The discography of American singer Diana Ross, the former lead singer of the Supremes, consists of 25 studio albums and 116 singles. Throughout her career, Ross has sold over 100 million records worldwide. Billboard ranked her as the 47th Greatest Artist of all time and the 11th Greatest Hot 100 Female Artist of all time. In 1993, Guinness World Records crowned Ross as the "most successful female artist in music history". Her 11th studio album "Diana" remains the best-selling album of her career, selling more than 10 million copies around the world.

27 of her singles reached the Billboard top 40 in the US, 12 of them the Billboard top 10, and six of those reaching number one, placing her in a tie for fifth among the top female solo performers who have reached the top spot there. In the UK, she amassed a total of 47 top 40 singles with 20 of them reaching the top 10 and two of those reaching number one. In the US, 17 albums reached the Billboard top 40, four of those the top 10, and one album topping the chart. In the UK, 26 albums reached the top 40, eight of those the top 10, and one album topping the chart.

Ross sang lead on a top 75 hit single at least once every year from 1964 to 1996 in the UK, a period of 32 consecutive years and a record for any performer. She is among a select group of artists whose albums and singles combined have spent more than 1000 weeks on the UK charts, with her singles totalling 569 weeks (10.9 years) and her albums spending a total of 629 weeks (12 years) on the charts. As of 2022 Diana Ross has 32 albums certified by the BPI (1 Multi-Platinum, 6 Platinum, 16 Gold, 9 Silver).

Albums

Studio albums

Soundtrack albums

Live albums

Compilation albums

 Diana Ross' Greatest Hits was released as Greatest Hits 2 in the UK.

Video albums

Extended plays

Singles

1970–1981 (Motown era)

Other charted songs

  "Sorry Doesn't Always Make It Right" was originally released as Motown US & UK single, February 1975, b/w "Together". Later it was included on the album Ross (1978).
  The first released version of "We Can Never Light That Old Flame Again" was a non-album single in 1982, and was remixed by Berry Gordy and James Anthony Carmichael. Then it was included on the Deluxe Edition of the album Diana.
  "Ain't No Mountain High Enough" was re-release as a single for the US CD release, the 1986 Motown two-for-one "2 All Time Great Classic Albums" Ain't No Mountain High Enough/Surrender.

International singles (not released in the US)

1981–1988 (RCA era)
 Releases internationally  were on Capitol Records.

  "All of You" was originally planned as a duet for Iglesias' album 1100 Bel Air Place. According to writer J. Randy Taraborrelli in Diana Ross: A Biography, "The third track on side two of the album was originally 'Fight For It' (the B-side of 'Swept Away').  With the success of 'All Of You,' RCA got clearance from CBS to include it in place of 'Fight For It'" (515).
  A remixed version of "Chain Reaction" was issued as a single. This version is not included on any RCA album by Diana Ross.

International singles (not released in the US)

  "Up Front" was remixed by Jolley & Swain for its European release. The original version was included on the album Ross (1983).

1988–2001 (Motown II era)
 Releases in the UK were on EMI, which like Motown was eventually acquired by Universal Music Group.

Other charted songs (US)

 These singles were special releases that later were included in her discography.
 The single "Paradise" was originally released as the B-side of "This House". Due to the attention received by club-goers it was remixed by Shep Pettibone for its release. The original version was included on the album Workin' Overtime (1989).
 "I Will Survive" hadn't been officially released as a single in the US, when it charted at Billboard Hot Dance Club Songs.
 "Sugarfree" was never released as a single. It gained some R&B airplay and peaked at No. 21 on the Billboard Bubbling Under R&B/Hip-Hop Songs Chart.

International singles (not released in the US)

2002–present

Dance Club Play chart entries
From the inception of the Billboard Dance Club Play chart (also known as Club Play Singles, and formerly known as Hot Dance Club Play and Hot Dance/Disco) until the week of February 16, 1991, several (or even all) songs on an EP or album could occupy the same position if more than one track from a release was receiving significant play in clubs. Beginning with the February 23, 1991 issue, the dance chart became "song specific", meaning only one song could occupy each position at a time. Therefore;
 "Your Love Is So Good for Me" and "Top of the World" was a double A-side 12" single, so these two count as one No. 15 on this chart.
 "Lovin', Livin' and Givin'" and "What You Gave Me" was a double A-side 12" single, so these two also count as one No. 35 on this chart.
 "The Boss", "No One Gets the Prize" and "It's My House" all appear on Ross' The Boss album, so these three count as one No. 1 on the Club Play chart.
 "Upside Down" and "I'm Coming Out" was a double A-side 12" single, so these two also count as one No. 1 on this chart.
 "Mirror, Mirror" and "Work That Body" was a double A-side 12" single, so these two also count as one No. 14 on this chart.

Notes

 US chart positions below No. 100 were compiled from Billboard magazine's Bubbling Under Hot 100 Singles and Bubbling Under R&B/Hip-Hop Singles charts.

References

See also
 The Supremes discography
 List of best-selling music artists
 List of number-one hits (United States)
 List of artists who reached number one in the United States
 List of number-one dance hits (United States)
 List of artists who reached number one on the U.S. dance chart

External links
 [ Billboard chart history]
 

Discography
Discographies of American artists
Pop music discographies
Rhythm and blues discographies
Soul music discographies